is a single released by Gackt on August 10, 2005 under Nippon Crown. It peaked at third place on the Oricon weekly chart and charted for nine weeks. It was used as a theme song for the TV drama . It was certified gold by RIAJ.

Music video
The music video shows two vampires from the "Moon" story and its album Diabolos.

Track listing

References

2005 singles
Gackt songs
Japanese television drama theme songs
Songs written by Gackt
2005 songs